The Tunis Institute of Fine Arts is a fine arts institute in Tunis, Tunisia.

Founded in 1923, its seat was located at the Dribat Ben Abdallah near Tourbet el Bey with its former name Tunis School of Fine Arts. The Institute of Tunis contributed to the rise of the plastic arts movement in Tunisia, particularly after the Second World War.

Notable Students
Former students of the institute include : 
 Azzedine Alaïa
 Abdelfattah Boussetta
 Antonio Corpora
 Ammar Farhat
 Safia Farhat
 Abdelaziz Gorji
 Mohamed Saadi 
 Nadia Kaabi-Linke
 Mahmoud Sehili
 Hedi Turki
 Yahia Turki
 Zoubeir Turki
 Ali Zenaidi

References

This article incorporates some text translated from arabic Wikipedia

External links

 
Tunisian art
Arts in Tunisia
Tunis
1923 establishments in Tunisia
1923 in art
Educational institutions established in 1923